This is a list of members of the Australian Senate following the 2019 Australian federal election held on 18 May 2019. Terms for newly elected senators representing the Australian states began on 1 July 2019. Terms for senators in the Australian Capital Territory and Northern Territory began on the day of the election, 18 May 2019.

Notes

References

Members of Australian parliaments by term
21st-century Australian politicians
Australian Senate lists
Australian Senate, 2019-2022
2010s politics-related lists